The tree-base litter-skink (Lygisaurus foliorum) is a species of skink found in New South Wales and Queensland in Australia.

References

Lygisaurus
Reptiles described in 1884
Skinks of Australia
Endemic fauna of Australia
Taxa named by Charles Walter De Vis